Acousticity may refer to:
 Acousticity (The Albion Band album), 1993
 Acousticity (David Grisman album), 1984